The men's decathlon at the 1958 European Athletics Championships was held in Stockholm, Sweden, at Stockholms Olympiastadion on 20 and 21 August 1958.

Medalists

Results

Final
20/21 August

Participation
According to an unofficial count, 19 athletes from 13 countries participated in the event.

 (1)
 (1)
 (1)
 (2)
 (1)
 (2)
 (2)
 (2)
 (2)
 (1)
 (2)
 (1)
 (1)

References

Decathlon
Combined events at the European Athletics Championships